Emily Kraft (born 18 February 2002) is a German-Irish international footballer who plays for Lewes of the Women's Championship. She made her debut for the Republic of Ireland women's national football team in January 2019.

Club career
Kraft played for SV Concordia Gernsheim and RSV Germania Pfungstadt, before joining FFC Frankfurt's youth structure as a 14-year-old. She remained with Frankfurt when they were taken over by the local men's club and became Eintracht Frankfurt in 2020. In July 2022 she transferred to Lewes.

International career
After previously representing the Germany women's national youth football team at under-15 and under-16 level, Kraft accepted a call-up to the Republic of Ireland women's national under-17 football team in October 2018. She was able to represent Ireland as her mother Orla is from Dublin. In her first match for Ireland under-17s she scored four goals in a 14–0 win over Albania.

Ireland's senior national team coach Colin Bell called up Kraft for the first time in January 2019, for a friendly against Belgium, staged at San Pedro del Pinatar, Spain. She started the match to win her first cap.

In March 2019, Kraft suffered an anterior cruciate ligament injury in Ireland under-17's 1–1 draw with Norway. She injured her cruciate again in July 2020 while training with her German club.

References

External links

Profile at German Football Association 

2002 births
Living people
Republic of Ireland women's association footballers
Republic of Ireland women's international footballers
Women's association football forwards
Footballers from Frankfurt
Irish people of German descent
German people of Irish descent
1. FFC Frankfurt players
Republic of Ireland women's youth international footballers
Lewes F.C. Women players
Women's Championship (England) players
Irish expatriate sportspeople in England
Expatriate women's footballers in England